Ricardo Ribeiro de Lima (born 27 March 1989), commonly known as Ricardinho, is a Brazilian professional footballer who plays as a defensive midfielder for Juventude.

Club career
Ricardinho was born in Itaberaí, Goiás, and was a Goiás youth graduate. He made his first team debut on 30 January 2008, starting in a 1–0 Campeonato Goiano away win against CRAC.

Mainly assigned to the under-20 squad, Ricardinho only made his Série A debut on 15 November 2009, coming on as a late substitute for Léo Lima in a 3–1 home win against Santo André. After being rarely used, he moved to Rio Branco-SP for the 2010 campaign.

After again featuring sparingly, Ricardinho returned to his native state and joined Série B side Vila Nova in October 2010. A regular starter during his two-year spell, he agreed to a contract with Avaí in December 2012.

Ricardinho began the 2014 campaign with Rio Branco-PR, later moving to Paraná, where he established himself as a regular starter in the right back. On 13 January 2016, after being deemed surplus to requirements by the latter club, he joined Criciúma.

Ricardinho was presented at Guarani on 21 December 2017, immediately becoming a starter and scoring the winning goal of the 2018 Campeonato Paulista Série A2 final against XV de Piracicaba. On 19 November 2018, he renewed his contract until December 2020.

On 3 August 2020, after appearing rarely during the season, Ricardinho moved to top-tier side Sport Recife.

Career statistics

Honours
Guarani
Campeonato Paulista Série A2: 2018

References

External links

1989 births
Living people
Brazilian footballers
Sportspeople from Goiás
Association football midfielders
Campeonato Brasileiro Série A players
Campeonato Brasileiro Série B players
Campeonato Brasileiro Série C players
Goiás Esporte Clube players
Rio Branco Esporte Clube players
Vila Nova Futebol Clube players
Avaí FC players
Rio Branco Sport Club players
Paraná Clube players
Criciúma Esporte Clube players
Guarani FC players
Sport Club do Recife players
Esporte Clube Juventude players